Cairns Holdings is a company of Zimbabwe.  It is principally a food company, and is based in Harare.  Cairns produces a wide variety of groceries, and produces wine.  The company is listed on the Zimbabwe Stock Exchange's industrial index. The company also produces a wide variety of canned food .

Group structure
Cairns Holdings Limited owns
100% of Paprika Successors Limited;
100% of Cairns Foods Limited; and
60% M E Charhon Limited.

External links
Cairns Foods official website

Companies listed on the Zimbabwe Stock Exchange
Food and drink companies of Zimbabwe
Manufacturing companies of Zimbabwe
Companies based in Harare